The 2015–16 St. Francis Brooklyn Terriers women's basketball team represents St. Francis College during the 2015–16 NCAA Division I women's basketball season.  The Terrier's home games are played at the Generoso Pope Athletic Complex. The team has been a member of the Northeast Conference since 1988. St. Francis Brooklyn is coached by John  Thurston, who is in his fourth year at the helm of the Terriers. Last year, the Terriers won the programs first NEC Tournament and participated in their first NCAA Tournament. For this season the Terriers return only one starter from last season and have 7 freshman joining the program.

The Terriers finished 7–22 overall and 4–14 in conference play. The Terriers failed to qualify for the NEC Tournament with their 9th-place finish. Maria Palarino was selected to the All-NEC Rookie Team and Leah Fechko was named the Northeast Conference Defensive Player of the Year and was selected to the All-NEC First Team. In addition on January 11, 2016, Fechko became the 16th member of the St. Francis Brooklyn women's basketball 1,000 points club. She is currently the Terriers' eighth all-time leading scorer with 1,216 points. The guard is the first player (men's or women's) to score 1,000 points, record 800 rebounds, 200 assists, and 200 steals in a career.

Roster

Schedule

|-
!colspan=9 style="background:#0038A8; border: 2px solid #CE1126;;color:#FFFFFF;"| Non-Conference Regular Season

|-
!colspan=9 style="background:#0038A8; border: 2px solid #CE1126;;color:#FFFFFF;"| Northeast Conference Regular Season

See also
2015–16 St. Francis Brooklyn Terriers men's basketball team

References

Saint Francis Brooklyn
St. Francis Brooklyn Terriers women's basketball seasons
Saint Francis Brooklyn Terriers women's basketball
Saint Francis Brooklyn Terriers women's basketball